Camp Lawrence J. Hearn was a United States Army facility formerly located in Palm City, San Diego, California. The Third Oregon Infantry established the camp in 1916 during its border service; it was abandoned in 1931 by the 11th Cavalry Regiment when the regiment moved to the Presidio of Monterey.

History
Beginning in 1916, the Third Oregon Infantry established the post during its border service. The United States Army, maintained Camp Lawrence J. Hearn, in honor of Major Hearn of the 21st Infantry Regiment, in response to the Mexican Civil War, and was manned by the 1st Cavalry Regiment. It was abandoned in August 1920, but re-established by the 11th Cavalry Regiment in October of that same year. Brigadier General F.C. Marshall visited the post just before he died in a plane crash, traveling to Tucson, Arizona. Until 1921, the post had no structures, and consisted of a tent cantonment; soldiers requiring medical care would be sent to Fort Rosecrans for treatment. However, conditions on the post did not improve significantly, and was described by Army Chief of Staff Major General Summerall as being like a "logging camp", composed of "tumbledown shacks". In 1924, cavalrymen from the post assisted local officers, and federal agents in enforcing a 9 pm curfew at the international border crossing. It continued to be in use until it was abandoned in 1931. Later the former post was considered by the Coastal Artillery Corps for the site of a battery, however this was never built.

References

External links

Closed installations of the United States Army
Military facilities in San Diego County, California